Ch Tahir Mahmood Chahal Jatt (چوہدری طاھر محمود چاھل جٹ: born 20 April 1984 in Lahore) is a prominent local politician. Chaudhary Tahir Mahmood Chahal Jatt S/O Ch Allah Deta Chahal Jatt FROM Nanger Sharif Railway Station Kana Kachha LAHORE. NA-129, PP-160 UC 252.

Political career
He started his political career from Lahore as a student activist. Later on he was elected Nominative Voice Chairman of UC-252 Halloki From Nanger Sharif/ Railway Station Kana Kachha LAHORE NA-129, PP-160.

Chaudhry Tahir Mahmood Chahal Jatt is married and has two daughters.

References

External links
Official site
 National Assembly

Pakistan Muslim League (N) politicians
1949 births
Living people
People from Nankana Sahib District
Punjabi people
University of the Punjab alumni